Adiong is a surname. Notable people with the surname include:

 Ansaruddin Alonto Adiong, Filipino politician
 Mamintal Alonto Adiong Jr., Filipino politician
 Mamintal Adiong Sr. (1936–2004), Filipino politician

Surnames of Philippine origin